Ulick is a masculine given name in the English language. It is an Anglicised form of the Irish Uilleac and Uilleag. These Irish names are of an uncertain origin, although they are thought most probably to be derived from the Old Norse Hugleikr. This Old Norse name is composed of two elements: the first, hugr, means "heart", "mind", "spirit"; the second element, leikr, means "play", "sport". The other possibility is that the Irish names are diminutive forms of Uilliam, the Irish form of the English William.

List of people with the name
Sir Ulick Burke, 3rd Baronet (died 1708), Irish County Galway landowner and politician
Ulick Bourke (1829–1887), Irish scholar and writer who founded the Gaelic Union, which developed into the Gaelic League
Ulick Burke, 1st Marquess of Clanricarde (born 1604), Irish nobleman and figure in English Civil War
Ulick Burke, 3rd Earl of Clanricarde, Irish peer, died 1601
Ulick Burke (politician) (born 1943), Irish Fine Gael politician
(Ulick) Peter Burke, British historian
Ulick Burke of Annaghkeen (died 1353), Irish nobleman, the third son of William Liath Burke
Ulick Burke of Umhaill (died 1343), the son of Richard an Forbair de Burke, and grandson of William Liath Burke
Ulick Considine (1901–1950), born in Himachal Pradesh, a cricketer who played as an amateur for Somerset
Ulick de Burgh, 1st Marquess of Clanricarde KP, PC (1802–1874), British Whig politician
Ulick de Burgh, Lord Dunkellin (1827–1867), Anglo-Irish soldier and politician
Ulick Lupede (born 1984), French footballer
Ulick McEvaddy, former Irish army officer and native of Swinford County Mayo
Ulick na gCeann Burke, 1st Earl of Clanricarde (died 1544), 12th Clanricarde and 1st Earl of Clanricarde
Ulick Nally, parish priest, fl. 1680–1697
Ulick O'Connor (1928–2019), Irish writer, historian and critic
Ulick Varange, pen name of the American far-right political philosopher Francis Parker Yockey (1917–1960)

References

Irish masculine given names
English-language masculine given names